Nordex SE is a European company that designs, sells and manufactures wind turbines. The company's headquarters is located in the German city of Rostock while management is situated in Hamburg. Production takes place in Rostock as well as in China and in the city of Heroica Matamoros Matamoros, Tamaulipas, state of Tamaulipas, México  for a brief time in Jonesboro, Arkansas. The company was founded in 1985 in Give, Denmark. Since then the company steadily grew. In 1995 Nordex was the first company to mass-produce a 1 MW turbine booster. The company Südwind Babcock-Borsig has been fully implented into Nordex on October 1, 2001.
Nordex began also producing the turbines of the manufacturer Südwind, which had previously gone bankrupt. Nordex started producing turbines in the 1.5 MW class (ProTec MD 1,500 kW) from 2001 - originally from "pro + pro Energiesysteme" (a subsidiary of aerodyn Energiesysteme GmbH and Denker & Wulf ) developed the S70 and later the S77 - under license.

In 2016, the wind turbine manufacture business unit of Spanish conglomerate Acciona, Acciona Windpower, merged with those of Nordex to form Nordex Group.

Wind turbines 
As of 2013, the third generation of Nordex wind turbines included two platforms, rated at 2.4 and 3.3 MW.

In Europe, Africa and North America Nordex manufactures and sells the Gamma series, a product family comprising the N90/2500, the N100/2500 and the N117/2400. The N90/2500 is a turbine being developed for strong winds. The N100/2500 consists of two versions, Highspeed and Lowspeed, the first one for rather windy locations, the second for medium wind conditions. The N117/2400 was designed especially for low-wind regions (IEC 3). The hub height of the 2.4-2.5 MW windturbines reaches from 65 meters for the N90/2500 to 141 meters for the low wind version of the N117/2400.

Technical data 2.5MW Gamma class

Delta-Class 

In 2013 Nordex launched the Delta-Class-Series, entering series production in January 2014 with prototypes installed in mid-2013. There will be two new types of turbines, the N100/3300 strong-wind turbine and the N117/3000, which is designed for medium-wind sites. Both turbines feature the rotorblades already used in the Gamma-Series, with the rotorblades of the N117 being slightly upgraded to withstand the higher wind speeds in IEC wind class 2a. Both turbines are equipped with a three-stage gearbox and a doubly fed asynchronous generator.

See also 

Lamma Winds
List of wind turbine manufacturers
Wind power in Germany
Offshore wind power

References

External links 

Wind turbine manufacturers
Engineering companies of Germany
Companies based in Mecklenburg-Western Pomerania
German brands
Renewable resource companies established in 1985
Danish companies established in 1985
Companies in the TecDAX